Estefania Carròs i de Mur (1455 – March 16, 1511), was a Spanish educator.

She was born to Brianda de Mur and Nicolau Carròs i d’Arborea, who was viceroy of Sardinia in 1461-1478. When her parents moved to Sardinia, she was left in the care of her aunt Isabel de Mur, who was a lady-in-waiting to queen Juana Enriquez and a governess of the princess Joanna. Estefania Carròs did not wish to marry nor become a nun, the two accepted choices for a noblewoman. Instead, she settled in a house owned by her father at Plaza de Santa Ana in Barcelona, where she established a secular school for girls from the nobility and the burgher class. Juana de Aragón (1469 – bef. 1522), illegitimate daughter of Ferdinand II of Aragon, was one of her students. Her initiative was unusual for her time - in this period, schools for girls were normally convent schools. She was evidently respected for her school and had a large network of female co-workers and supporters.

References
 «Diccionari Biogràfic de Dones: Estefania Carròs i de Mur»
 Comas Via, Mireia; Vinyoles i Vidal, Teresa (2004). Estefanía Carròs y de Mur (ca. 1455-1511). Madrid: Ediciones del Orto.

1455 births
1511 deaths
16th-century Spanish educators
15th-century Spanish educators
16th-century Spanish women
15th-century Spanish women